Gheorghe Lungu (born July 5, 1978 in București) is a boxer from Romania.

He participated in the 2000 Summer Olympics for his native European country. There he was stopped in the second round of the nmen's lightweight (– 60 kg) division by Mexico's eventual bronze medalist Cristián Bejarano.

Lungu won the bronze medal in the same division one year earlier, at the 1999 World Amateur Boxing Championships in Houston, Texas.

External links
 
 

1978 births
Lightweight boxers
Boxers at the 2000 Summer Olympics
Olympic boxers of Romania
Sportspeople from Bucharest
Living people
Romanian male boxers
AIBA World Boxing Championships medalists